Guzolândia is a municipality in the state of São Paulo in Brazil. The population is 5,307 (2020 est.) in an area of 252 km². The elevation is 465 m.

References

Municipalities in São Paulo (state)